Ibrahima Sory ″Passy″ Camara (born 6 October 1992) is a Guinean footballer who plays for FC Dacia Chișinău.

At the age of 15, Camara signed with first league Moldovan team, Tiligul-Tiras Tiraspol, where he played two seasons.

In 2010, while he had a contract with Olimpia Bălți, he signed another contract with Academia Chișinău and began training with them. Then, Moldovan Football Federation decided that Camara was a player of Olimpia Bălți and banned Camara for six matchdays and fined him US$500.

References

External links

Profile at footballdatabase
Profile at footmercato.net
Profile at football365.fr

1992 births
Living people
Guinean footballers
CS Tiligul-Tiras Tiraspol players
FC Dacia Chișinău players
CSF Bălți players
FC Tiraspol players
FC Dinamo-Auto Tiraspol players
Association football midfielders
Moldovan Super Liga players
Guinean expatriate footballers
Expatriate footballers in Moldova
Guinean expatriate sportspeople in Moldova